"So Sad (To Watch Good Love Go Bad)" is a song written by Don Everly, which was released by The Everly Brothers in 1960. The song was later a country hit for multiple artists in the 1970s and 80s.

The Everly Brothers version
In 1960, The Everly Brothers released the song as a single and on the album It's Everly Time. The song was a top 10 hit in multiple countries, and spent 12 weeks on the Billboard Hot 100 chart, peaking at No. 7, while reaching No. 4 on the United Kingdom's Record Retailer and New Musical Express charts, and No. 7 on New Zealand's "Lever Hit Parade". The song was a major hit in other countries as well.

Chart performance

Cover versions
In 1968, The Hombres included a cover on their only album Let It Out (Let It All Hang Out).

In 1969, Dillard and Clark included a cover on their LP "Through the Morning, Through the Night". This group consisted of Gene Clark of The Byrds and Doug Dillard of The Dillards, as well as future member of The Eagles, Bernie Leadon.

Brian Hyland released a version of the song on his 1969 album Tragedy-A Million to One.

In 1970, a cover of was released by Hank Williams, Jr. and Lois Johnson as a single and on the album Removing the Shadow. Their version reached No. 12 on Billboards Hot Country Singles chart, No. 8 on the Cash Box Country Top 65, No. 8 on the Record World Top Country Singles chart, and No. 10 on Canada's "Top 50 RPM Country" chart.

Connie Smith released a cover of the song in 1976, as a single and on her album I Don't Wanna Talk It Over Anymore. Smith's version reached No. 31 on the Billboards Hot Country Singles chart and No. 19 on the Cash Box Top 100 Country chart. 

In 1977, Don Everly released a solo version of the song on the album Brother Juke-Box.

A cover was released by Steve Wariner in 1978, which reached No. 76 on the Billboards Hot Country Singles chart, No. 73 on the Cash Box Top 100 Country chart, and No. 81 on the Record World Country Singles Chart.

Emmylou Harris released a cover of the song on her 1982 album Last Date, and as a single. In 1983, Harris's version reached No. 28 on the Billboards Hot Country Singles chart, No. 31 on Cash Boxs Top 100 Country Singles, and No. 14 on Canada's RPM "Country 50 Singles" chart.

The Sweethearts of the Rodeo covered the song on their One Time, One Night album in 1998, but the song was not released.

The French singer Françoise Hardy included the song in her year 2000 album Clair-obscur as a duet with Étienne Daho.

Jeff Lynne also recorded it on his album Long Wave in 2012.

References

1960 songs
1960 singles
The Everly Brothers songs
Hank Williams Jr. songs
Connie Smith songs
Steve Wariner songs
Emmylou Harris songs
Songs written by Don Everly
Warner Records singles